Clivina laevifrons is a species of ground beetle in the subfamily Scaritinae. It was described by Maximilien Chaudoir in 1842.

References

laevifrons
Beetles described in 1842